Horseheads 1855 Extension Historic District is a national historic district located at Horseheads in Chemung County, New York.  The residential district includes a rich variety of exceptionally well preserved examples of the vernacular architectural styles once popular in such communities. The included structures reflect the diversity of architectural styles popular between 1860 and 1920.

It is adjacent to Hanover Square and Horseheads High School.

It was listed on the National Register of Historic Places in 1980.

Gallery

References

Historic districts on the National Register of Historic Places in New York (state)
Historic districts in Chemung County, New York
National Register of Historic Places in Chemung County, New York